John Vake (born 15 June 1991) is a Tongan New Zealander pro-mixed martial arts fighter and wrestler, who has represented Tonga at the Commonwealth Games.

vake was born in Auckland, New Zealand and educated at Kelston Boys' High School. He took up wrestling after failing to get into the school rugby team. His first professional MMA fight was in 2012. In 2018, he opened a fight club in Auckland to help troubled youth. He also runs a Whānau Ora-funded program for Kelston Boys' High School students.

In 2022 he was selected for the Tongan team for the 2022 Commonwealth Games in Birmingham, England. He was defeated in the first round by Muhammad Sharif Tahir.

References

Living people
1991 births
New Zealand sportspeople of Tongan descent
People from Auckland
Tongan wrestlers
New Zealand male mixed martial artists
Mixed martial artists utilizing wrestling
Commonwealth Games competitors for Tonga
Wrestlers at the 2022 Commonwealth Games